Benjamin Harvey Hill (September 14, 1823 – August 16, 1882) was a politician whose career spanned state and national politics, and the Civil War. He served in the Georgia legislature in both houses. Although he had opposed secession, he stayed with the South and served as a Confederate senator representing Georgia.

After the war and near the end of the Reconstruction era, Hill was elected in 1874 to the United States House of Representatives, and in 1877 as a U.S. senator from Georgia. He served in the Senate until his death in 1882.

Early life
Hill was born September 14, 1823, in Hillsboro, Georgia, in Jasper County. He was of Welsh and Irish American ancestry.  He attended the University of Georgia in Athens, Georgia, where he was a member of the Demosthenian Literary Society. He graduated in 1844 with first honors. He was admitted to the Georgia bar later in 1844. He married Caroline E. Holt in Athens, Georgia in 1845.

Early career

As a politician, Hill was affiliated with a number of parties, reflecting the volatile politics before and after the American Civil War. He was elected to the state legislature of Georgia in 1851 as a member of the Whig Party. He supported Millard Fillmore running on the Know-Nothing ticket in 1856, and was an elector for that party in the Electoral College. In 1857, he ran for governor of Georgia unsuccessfully against the Democratic nominee Joseph E. Brown. In 1859, he was elected to the state senate as a Unionist. In 1860, he was again an elector, this time for John Bell and the Unionist party.

Hill was known as "the peerless orator" for his skill in delivering speeches, and he was the only non-Democratic member of the Georgia secession convention on January 16, 1861. He spoke publicly against the dissolution of the Union, along with Alexander Stephens, a former opponent. Following Stephens' highly regarded argument, based on a conservative reading of the Constitution, Hill struck a more pragmatic tone.

His arguments related to the conservative belief that disunion would ultimately lead to the abolition of slavery and the downfall of Southern society. He quoted Henry Ward Beecher, a Northern abolitionist, who enthusiastically supported the dissolution of the Union as a means to end slavery, and described the anti-slavery Republican Party as a "disunionist" party, in contrast to the "Union men and Southern men" participating in the convention. Acknowledging the need to respond to the threat of Lincoln's election, Hill argued that his fellow Georgians should continue to resist Lincoln democratically within the bounds of the Constitution.  He compared this course to George Washington, "so cool, so brave, and so thoughtful." He argued that the Northern states would eventually follow the British course of rising abolitionist thought, followed by acceptance again of slavery due to economic necessity. But he allowed that the South should prepare for secession and war if it should become necessary.

Hill voted against secession, but became a political ally of Jefferson Davis, who was elected as president of the Confederacy. When the Confederate government was formed, Hill transferred to the Confederate Provisional Congress. He was subsequently elected by the Georgia legislature to the Confederate States Senate, a term which he held throughout its existence.

At one point in the Confederate Senate, Hill and fellow senator William Lowndes Yancey had to be separated by other members after a bloody scuffle on the floor.

At the end of the Civil War, Hill was arrested as a Confederate official by the Union and confined in Fort Lafayette from May until July 1865.

Later career
Unlike many Confederate politicians, Hill had a long and distinguished career as a "reconstructed" Southerner and U.S. politician. He ultimately became a Democrat after the Civil War ended. He spoke out passionately against Radical Reconstruction and in the summer of 1867 made a series of speeches in Atlanta, the most famous being the Davis House speech of July 16, 1867, denouncing the Reconstruction Acts of 1867. His courage and eloquence enhanced his regional fame and won him national recognition.

In 1874, he was elected to the U. S. House of Representatives, serving from May 5, 1875 - March 3, 1877. He quickly won a reputation as a spokesman for the South. He was later elected by the Georgia legislature to the U.S. Senate on January 26, 1877, as Reconstruction was ending. He served in the U.S. Senate from March 4, 1877, until his death on August 16, 1882.  His obituary was featured on the front page of the Atlanta Constitution on August 17, 1882.

Death
Hill is buried in historic Oakland Cemetery in Atlanta, Georgia.

Legacy and honors
 A life-size statue of Benjamin Harvey Hill looking down from atop a similarly sized plinth was installed inside the Georgia State Capitol in Atlanta, Georgia.
 A larger than life portrait of Hill hangs in the Capitol Rotunda. 
 Ben Hill County, Georgia, founded in 1906, was named in his honor.

See also
List of signers of the Georgia Ordinance of Secession
List of United States Congress members who died in office (1790–1899)

References

External links

Birthplace of Benjamin Harvey Hill historical marker

1823 births
1882 deaths
19th-century American politicians
American slave owners
Burials at Oakland Cemetery (Atlanta)
Confederate States of America senators
Democratic Party members of the United States House of Representatives from Georgia (U.S. state)
Democratic Party United States senators from Georgia (U.S. state)
Deputies and delegates to the Provisional Congress of the Confederate States
Georgia (U.S. state) Know Nothings
Georgia (U.S. state) state senators
Georgia (U.S. state) Whigs
Members of the Georgia House of Representatives
People from Jasper County, Georgia
People of Georgia (U.S. state) in the American Civil War
Signers of the Confederate States Constitution
Signers of the Provisional Constitution of the Confederate States
Signers of the Georgia Ordinance of Secession
University of Georgia alumni
United States senators who owned slaves